
Lac de Fully (or Lac supérieur de Fully) is a reservoir in the canton of Valais, Switzerland.

See also
List of mountain lakes of Switzerland

External links
Forces Motrices de Fully profile

Lakes of Valais
Reservoirs in Switzerland